Moulvi Sir Rafiuddin Ahmed (1865–1954) was an Indian Muslim barrister, journalist and politician. He was generally known as the Moulvi.

He was educated at Deccan College, Pune, and King's College London. In 1892, he became a barrister-at-law in the Middle Temple. He was a close friend of Abdul Karim (the Munshi), the Indian secretary of Queen Victoria.

Victoria was instrumental in involving Ahmed in diplomatic approaches to Sultan Abdul Hamid II of the Ottoman Empire in the late 1890s, and unsuccessfully suggested that he be appointed to the British embassy in Constantinople.

He was a prominent member of the Muslim Patriotic League, and under the Montagu–Chelmsford Reforms, which introduced greater self-government to British India, he was elected to the council of the Bombay Presidency. In 1928, he was appointed Minister of Agriculture and then as Minister of Education where he served till 1934. For his work in government, he was knighted in 1932.

He died in his native Pune, where he had lived for the last 20 years of his life.

References

1865 births
1954 deaths
Alumni of King's College London
Indian barristers
19th-century Indian Muslims
20th-century Indian Muslims
Members of the Middle Temple
Writers from Pune
Indian Knights Bachelor
19th-century Indian lawyers
20th-century Indian lawyers
Politicians from Pune
Journalists from Maharashtra
19th-century Indian journalists
20th-century Indian journalists
Members of the Bombay Legislative Council
Knights Bachelor